Kelantan Royal Mausoleum or Langgar Royal Mausoleum is a Kelantan royal burial ground located at Kampung Langgar near Kota Bharu, Kelantan, Malaysia.

List of graves

Sultan graves
 Long Yunus  (died 1798)
 Sultan Muhammad I  (died 1835)
 Sultan Muhammad II  (died 1886)
 Sultan Ahmad (died 1889)
 Sultan Muhammad III (died 1890)
 Sultan Mansur  (died 1899)
 Sultan Muhammad IV (died 20 December 1920)
 Sultan Ismail (died 20 June 1944)
 Sultan Ibrahim (died 9 July 1960)
 Sultan Yahya Petra – 6th Yang di-Pertuan Agong (died 29 March 1979)
 Sultan Ismail Petra (died 28 September 2019)

Sultanah/Raja Perempuan graves
 Sultanah Zainab binti Muhammad Amin (died 23 July 1928)
 Raja Perempuan Zainab I binti Tengku Zainal Abidin (died 28 September 1985)
 Raja Perempuan Zainab II binti Almarhum Tengku Sri Utama Raja Tengku Muhammad Petra – 6th Raja Permaisuri Agong (died 10 January 1993)

Royal family graves
 Tengku Long Abdul Ghaffar ibni Al-Marhum Sultan Muhammad II – Tengku Temenggong (died: unknown date)
 Tengku Long Zainal Abidin ibni Al-Marhum Sultan Muhammad III – Raja Dewa (died 1945)
 Tengku Muhammad Hamzah bin Tengku Zainal Abidin – Tengku Sri Maharaja (died 25 February 1962)
 Tengku Muhammad Petra bin Tengku Idris – Tengku Sri Utama Raja (died 11 March 1949)
 Tengku Kembang Petri binti Al-Marhum Sultan Muhammad IV – Tengku Maharani Putri (died 26 November 1949)
 Tengku Embong binti Al-Marhum Sultan Muhammad III (died 19 April 1953)
 Tengku Long Abdul Rahman bin Tengku Muhammad Petra – Tengku Sri Kelana Diraja (died 30 August 1965)
 Tengku Mariam binti Tengku Ahmad (died 1965)
 Cik Embong binti Daud – Che’ Puan Besar (died 31 December 1971)
 Tengku Indra Petra ibni Almarhum Sultan Ibrahim – Tengku Besar Indra (died 1983)
 Tengku Long Ahmad bin Tengku Long Abdul Ghaffar – Tengku Panglima Raja (died 1 August 1989)
 Tengku Yah binti Tengku Sulaiman – Tengku Maharani (died 16 August 1995)
 Tengku Zainal Mulok ibni Almarhum Sultan Ibrahim – Tengku Temenggong (died 25 April 1996)
 Tengku Iskandar Shah ibni Almarhum Sultan Ibrahim – Tengku Laksamana (died: unknown date)
 Tengku Nurulain binti Almarhum Sultan Ibrahim (died: unknown date)
 Tengku Maznah binti Almarhum Sultan Ibrahim (died: unknown date)
 Tengku Putra ibni Almarhum Sultan Ibrahim (died: unknown date)
 Tengku Badrol Alam ibni Almarhum Sultan Ibrahim (died: unknown date)
 Tengku Petri binti Almarhum Sultan Ibrahim (died: unknown date)   
 Tengku Wok binti Almarhum Sultan Ibrahim (died: unknown date)
 Tengku Mastura binti Almarhum Sultan Ibrahim (died: unknown date)
 Tengku Shahariman ibni Almarhum Sultan Ibrahim (died: unknown date)
 Tengku Feissal ibni Almarhum Sultan Ibrahim – Tengku Kaya Perkasa (died 19 May 1997)
 Tengku Azizah binti Tengku Muhammad Hamzah (died 25 December 1999)
 Tengku Long Haniff bin Tengku Long Abdul Rahman (died 4 February 2003)
 Datin Nik Sharifah binti Hj. Nik Jaafar – Che’ Puan Kaya Perkasa (died 7 November 2008)
 Tengku Noor Asiah binti Tengku Ahmad (died 25 September 2013)
 Raja Aman Shah bin Raja Shahar Shah – Tengku Sri Kelana Diraja (died 26 January 2018)
 Tengku Aman Shah ibni Almarhum Sultan Ibrahim (died 16 August 2020)
 Tengku Abdul Aziz bin Tengku Muhammad Hamzah – Tengku Sri Utama Raja (died 20 September 2020)
 Tengku Merjan binti Almarhum Sultan Yahya Petra – Tengku Puan Sri Utama Raja (died 15 October 2020)
 Tengku Rohani binti Almarhum Sultan Yahya Petra (died 31 December 2021)

Non-leaders grave
 Dr Ali Othman Merican – Malay doctor (died 17 June 1945)
 Capt Datuk Khairi Mohamad – Pioneer civil aviator (died 12 November 2020)

Mausoleums in Malaysia
Buildings and structures in Kelantan